Kole may refer to:

Kole, a superhero from the DC Universe
Kole (name)
Kolë, an Albanian masculine given name
Kole, Democratic Republic of the Congo
Kole District, a district in Northern Uganda
Kole, Uganda, the principal municipality in Kole District
Bakole language of Cameroon
Bakole people of Cameroon
Fr Eugene Kole OFM Conv served as Quincy University's 20th president
KOLE, a radio station
Kole, an early ring name of American professional wrestler Booker Huffman, better known as Booker T